Steffi Jacob (born Steffi Hanzlik on 30 September 1975 in Schmalkalden) is a German skeleton racer who has competed in the early 2000s. She won a gold medal in the inaugural women's skeleton event at the 2000 FIBT World Championships in Igls.

Hanzlik also finished tied for seventh (with Russia's Yekaterina Mironova) at the 2002 Winter Olympics in Salt Lake City.

She also won the women's Skeleton World Cup overall title twice (Inaugural 1996-7, 1998-9).

References
2002 women's skeleton results
List of women's skeleton World Cup champions since 1997.
Women's skeleton world championship medalists since 2000

1975 births
Living people
German female skeleton racers
People from Schmalkalden
Skeleton racers at the 2002 Winter Olympics
Olympic skeleton racers of Germany
Sportspeople from Thuringia
20th-century German women
21st-century German women